The Multinational Specialized Unit (MSU), is a unit of the Italian Carabinieri, dedicated to the military missions abroad, including the military and civilian police tasks, peacekeeping operations, crowd and riot control.

After its creation in 1998, MSU units took part in many different NATO operations, in Albania, Kosovo, Bosnia Herzegovina and Iraq.

History 

Initially it has employed members of the 7th Carabinieri Regiment "Trentino-Alto Adige", the 13th Carabinieri Regiment "Friuli-Venezia Giulia" and the 1st Parachute Carabinieri Regiment "Tuscania". During the next years it has employed members from all over Italy, from every other Carabinieri units.

Bosnia and Herzegovina 

The first mission where MSU was involved was the NATO-SFOR, in Bosnia and Herzegovina during the Yugoslav Wars. MSU was composed by Italian Carabinieri and members of the Romanian Military Police, among soldiers of Austria, Hungary and Slovenia.

Albania 

After the tension in the Balkan area, during the Yugoslav Wars, in particular in the northern part of Kosovo a MSU detachment was deployed in Albania during Operation Allied Harbor, to aid the country in the refugees management. The mission was codenamed AFOR.

Iraq 

During the NATO Mission, inside the Multi-National Force – Iraq, MSU was deployed alongside other Italians units. The Italian Mission codename was Operation Ancient Babylon. MSU was composed by Italian Carabinieri, Italian Army liaison officers, members of Romanian Military Police and Portuguese National Republican Guard.  During the mission MSU suffered heavy losses, in particular for the 2003 Nasiriyah bombing.

MSU-IRAQ Commanders 
Col. Georg Di Pauli (June-november 2003)
Col. Carmelo Burgio (november 2003-march 2004)
Col. Luciano Zubani (2004)
 Col. Claudio D'Angelo (2004)
Col. Paolo Nardone (2004-2005)
Col. Sebastiano Comitini (2005-2006)
...

Kosovo 

Since 1999, after the United Nations Security Council Resolution 1244, MSU has been deployed into Kosovo for peacekeeping operations within NATO-KFOR. After years it's still present in the theatre, contributing to maintain peace and stability in the country.

From 1999 to 2013 the French National Gendarmerie, Estonian Military Police and Austrian Military Police were also part of the MSU. Since 2013 it is composed entirely of the Italian Carabinieri and its main mission is to patrol the entire city of Mitrovica 24/7, in particular the Ibar Bridge.

The KFOR-MSU Regiment was commanded by Italian Carabinieri Colonel Ruggiero Capodivento. It is now led by Colonel Stefano Fedele.

KFOR-MSU Commanders

KFOR-MSU Vehicles 
 Land Rover Defender 90
 Land Rover Defender 110
 Land Rover Defender Ambulance
 Fiat Ducato Ambulance
 Land Rover Discovery series II and IV
 Mitsubishi Pajero
 Iveco ACM 80/90
 Iveco C-17 
 Iveco Daily
 VM90P
 Iveco RG-12 
 Iveco LMV

See also 
Carabinieri
Peacekeeping
Carabinieri Mobile Units Division
1st Carabinieri Mobile Brigade
2nd Carabinieri Mobile Brigade
Kosovo Force
SFOR
Operation Ancient Babylon
2003 Nasiriyah bombing
Yugoslav Wars

References

External links

Units and formations of the Carabinieri
Military units and formations established in 1998
Military units and formations of NATO
Kosovo War
NATO-led peacekeeping in the former Yugoslavia